YP Midwest Publishing LLC., originally Ameritech Publishing, Inc., was formed in 1983 during the Bell System Divestiture. It combined the former directory operations of Illinois Bell, Indiana Bell, Michigan Bell, Ohio Bell and Wisconsin Telephone. Ameritech Publishing published telephone directories in Indiana, Ohio, Michigan, and Wisconsin. Directories in Illinois were made in a joint venture with R. H. Donnelley.

History
Prior to brand standardization by SBC Communications, Ameritech directories were published under the PagesPlus brand. Ameritech Publishing's operations in Illinois and northwest Indiana were placed in a partnership with R. H. Donnelley, called DonTech, in 1999. Following brand standardization since 2002, Ameritech Publishing, the company, is currently known as Ameritech Publishing, Inc. d/b/a AT&T Advertising & Publishing.

Spinoff
In 2012, Ameritech Publishing (along with the rest of AT&T Advertising Solutions) was spun off into YP Holdings. Ameritech Publishing was then renamed YP Midwest Publishing LLC.

External links

Mon Service Client Website
1990 Profile of Ameritech Publishing

AT&T subsidiaries
Publishing companies established in 1983
Telephone directory publishing companies of the United States
YP Holdings
1983 establishments in Illinois
Companies based in Tucker, Georgia